Birsa College, Khunti is a college located in Khunti, Jharkhand, India. It is a constituent college of Ranchi University.

History
The college was established in 1961 by a group of philanthropists and was named after Birsa Munda. It became  constituent college of Ranchi University in 1977.

Campus
The college has a  campus which includes an administrative building, arts building, science building, common room, library, boys' hostel, girls hostel and sports facilities, including a fenced hockey ground, football ground, a stadium, volleyball court, and cricket ground.

See also
Education in India
Literacy in India
List of institutions of higher education in Jharkhand

References

External links
http://www.bscollegelohardaga.org/

Universities and colleges in Jharkhand
Colleges affiliated to Ranchi University
Khunti district
Educational institutions established in 1961
1961 establishments in Bihar